Nemanja Lazić (born 27 March 1990) is a Serbian football midfielder.

References

1990 births
Living people
Footballers from Belgrade
Association football defenders
Serbian footballers
FK Radnički Niš players
OFK Mladenovac players
RFK Grafičar Beograd players
FK Resnik players
FK Kovačevac players
FK Dinamo Pančevo players
Serbian expatriate footballers
Serbian expatriate sportspeople in Jordan
Serbian expatriate sportspeople in Albania
Expatriate footballers in Jordan
Expatriate footballers in Albania
KS Kastrioti players
Kategoria Superiore players